George Black Hester (August 20, 1902 – December 8, 1951) was a Canadian sprinter. He competed at the 1924 and 1928 Summer Olympics. He competed for Mercersburg Academy, under the guidance of Jimmy Curran, and the University of Michigan.

References

External links
 

1902 births
1951 deaths
Athletes (track and field) at the 1924 Summer Olympics
Athletes (track and field) at the 1928 Summer Olympics
Canadian male sprinters
Olympic track and field athletes of Canada
Sportspeople from Windsor, Ontario
Track and field athletes from Ontario
Mercersburg Academy alumni
Michigan Wolverines men's track and field athletes
20th-century Canadian people